Aayirathil Oruthi is a 1975 Indian Tamil-language drama film, directed by Avinashi Mani. The film stars K. R. Vijaya and K. Balaji. Jayasudha plays the love interest of Kamal Haasan. Srikanth plays the role of Sujatha's lover.

Plot

Cast 
 K. R. Vijaya as Janaki
 K. Balaji as Gopi
 Srikanth as Sathish
 Sujatha as Lakshmi
 Kamal Haasan as Kamal
 Jayasudha as Sudha
 Thengai Srinivasan as Kabalishwaran
 Manorama as Singari
 Suruli Rajan as Sivakolunthu
A. Sakunthala
 S. V. Ramadoss as Paranthaman (Guest Appearance)
 Sukumari as Jailer of police (Guest appearance)
 S. A. Ashokan (Guest Appearance)

Production 
K. R. G. Pictures produced the film. Kamal Haasan received a salary of ₹17,000. Bharathiraja worked as an assistant director.

Soundtrack 
The music was composed by V. Kumar.

Reception 
Kanthan of Kalki praised Vijaya's performance, saying that like the film's title, she too was one in a thousand.

References

External links 
 

1970s Tamil-language films
1975 films
Indian black-and-white films